Revolutionary Calendar may refer to:
Soviet calendar (Soviet revolutionary calendar)
French Republican Calendar (French Revolutionary Calendar)